Olympias Lympion is a Cypriot football club based in Lympia, Cyprus. Founded in 1955, the club is currently competing in the 2nd tier of Cypriot football.

References

Football clubs in Cyprus
Association football clubs established in 1944
1944 establishments in Cyprus